Alec Kellaway (1894–1973) was a South African–born actor best known for his work in Australian theatre and film, notably playing a number of character roles for director Ken G. Hall. He was the brother of Cecil Kellaway. He also worked as a producer in vaudeville and helped run the Talent School at Cinesound Productions.

Kellaway played a wide variety of roles for Ken Hall, ranging from a gay floorwalker in Dad and Dave Come to Town (1938) to a magician in Let George Do It (1938). Hall wrote in his memoirs that the actor "was never Alec Kellaway in any of them – a contrast to many actors, who play themselves in whatever part you give them. Alec always studied the part, got to really understand the person he was to play, then worried about how he would walk, talk, think."

Selected filmography 
 Lovers and Luggers (1937)
 The Broken Melody (1938)
 Let George Do It (1938)
 Dad and Dave Come to Town (1938)
 Gone to the Dogs (1939)
 Come Up Smiling (1939)
 Mr. Chedworth Steps Out (1939)
 Dad Rudd, MP (1940)
South West Pacific (1943)
 Smithy (1946)
 The Kangaroo Kid (1950)
Squeeze a Flower (1970)

References

External links

Alec Kellaway Biography at Australian Variety Theatre Archive
Alec Kellaway Australian theatre credits at AusStage

1894 births
1973 deaths
Australian male actors
Male actors from Cape Town
South African emigrants to Australia